Sverre Ditlev-Simonsen  (21 May 1900 – 1 February 2004) was a Norwegian ship owner.

He was born in Oslo to Olaf Ditlev-Simonsen and Magdalena Pedersen, and married Lily Kaurin in 1907. They had the son Per Ditlev-Simonsen.

Since 1929 he was running his own shipping business. He was active in organizational work, and assumed various positions in the Norwegian Shipowners' Association for more than twenty years. He was a board member of the Norwegian Maritime Museum from 1955, and chairman from 1964. He was decorated Commander of the Swedish Order of Vasa.

Ditlev-Simonsen was an active bandy player, a three times Norwegian champion.

References

1900s births
2004 deaths
Businesspeople from Oslo in shipping
Norwegian bandy players